1500 Louisiana Street, formerly Enron Center South, is a 600 ft (183m) tall skyscraper in Houston, Texas. It was completed in 2002 and has 40 floors and a total building area of 1,284,013sq.ft. It is the 17th tallest building in the city and the tallest completed in the 2000s. It was designed by César Pelli.

History
Enron, a Houston-based company, had the building constructed to serve as its US headquarters. Due to a scandal in late 2001 the company collapsed and filed for bankruptcy that same year; Enron never occupied the building. Intell Management and Investment Co. paid $102 million for the tower, which came equipped with technology that was, in 2003, the latest for energy firms. Charlie Giammalva of Lincoln Property Co., the leasing company of 1500 Louisiana, said that the building was "zero percent occupied." Giammalva said that the management of the building had contacted several firms, such as ExxonMobil, about the possibility of leasing space in the building. By July 2003 none of the firms contacted the management.

ChevronTexaco bought the building in 2004 for $340 million. By 2005 the firm announced that it would move out of the former Chevron Tower in Houston Center and moved into 1500 Louisiana Street. In 2006 4,000 employees worked in 1500 Louisiana.

See also

List of tallest buildings in Houston

References

External links

Emporis
Skyscraperpage
Houston Architecture (Archived 2009-06-22)

Skyscraper office buildings in Houston
Office buildings completed in 2002
2002 establishments in Texas
Buildings and structures in Houston
César Pelli buildings